Tamler Sommers is an American philosopher and writer. He is the son of the American philosopher Fred Sommers and the stepson of Christina Hoff Sommers. Sommers specializes in ethics and free will, and has commented on the ethics of the Alex Rodriguez performance-enhancing drugs scandal. His book Why Honor Matters examines the nature of honor in American discourse and defends several aspects of honor cultures. He currently co-hosts the podcast Very Bad Wizards with David A. Pizarro.

Sommers received his Ph.D. in philosophy at Duke University in 2005 and is currently a professor of philosophy at the University of Houston.

Books
 A Very Bad Wizard: Morality Behind the Curtain (2009). 
 Relative Justice: Cultural Diversity, Free Will, and Moral Responsibility (2012). 
 Why Honor Matters (2018).

References

External links
 Tammler Sommers

Living people
21st-century American philosophers
Year of birth missing (living people)
American people of Jewish descent